Leucophotis is a genus of moths of the family Crambidae. It contains only one species, Leucophotis pulchra, which is found on Fiji.

References

Pyraustinae
Crambidae genera
Taxa named by Arthur Gardiner Butler